The High Rock Canyon Wilderness is a U S Wilderness Area in Nevada under the Bureau of Land Management. It is located on the southwest side of High Rock Canyon and north of the Little High Rock Canyon Wilderness. It does not include the 4x4 trail in High Rock Canyon.

See also 
Black Rock Desert-High Rock Canyon Emigrant Trails National Conservation Area
Massacre Range

References

External links 
High Rock Canyon Wilderness - Wilderness Connect
High Rock Canyon Wilderness at Atlas Obscura

IUCN Category Ib
Wilderness areas of Nevada
Bureau of Land Management areas in Nevada
Protected areas of Washoe County, Nevada